Ahmad Daniel Bateman (born August 6, 1961) is a Canadian-American professional golfer.

Bateman played on the Nationwide Tour from 1996 to 2005, winning the Nike Carolina Classic in 1997. He also played on the Asian Tour from 1994 to 2006.

Professional wins (1)

Buy.com Tour wins (1)

Buy.com Tour playoff record (0–1)

References

External links

Canadian male golfers
American male golfers
USC Trojans men's golfers
Asian Tour golfers
PGA Tour golfers
Golfing people from Ontario
Sportspeople from Windsor, Ontario
1961 births
Living people